Nielsburg (formerly, Nielsburgh and Niellsburgh) is an unincorporated community in Placer County, California. It lies at an elevation of 1539 feet (469 m).

The Nielsburgh post office operated from 1855 to 1866. The name honors the first postmaster, Arthur C. Neill.

References

Unincorporated communities in California
Unincorporated communities in Placer County, California
1855 establishments in California